This article is about the demographic features of the population of the Federated States of Micronesia, including population density, ethnicity, education level, health of the populace, economic status, religious affiliations and other aspects of the population.

The Demographics of the Federated States of Micronesia refers to the population characteristics of people who inhabit the Federated States of Micronesia.  The indigenous population of the Federated States of Micronesia, which is predominantly Micronesian, consists of various ethnolinguistic groups. English has become the common language. Population growth remains high at more than 3%, but is ameliorated somewhat by net emigration.

The island of Pingelap is genetically notable for the prevalence of the extreme form of color blindness known as maskun.

CIA World Factbook demographic statistics 

The following demographic statistics are from the CIA World Factbook, unless otherwise indicated.

Population:
102,436 (July 2020 est.)

Age structure:
0-14 years:
NA
15-64 years:
NA
65 years and over:
NA

Population growth rate:
-0.6% (2020 est.)

Birth rate:
18.9 births/1,000 population (2020 est.)

Death rate:
4.3 deaths/1,000 population (2020 est.)

Net migration rate:
-20.9 migrant(s)/1,000 population (2020 est.)

Infant mortality rate:
17.8 deaths/1,000 live births (2020 est.)

Life expectancy at birth:
total population:
73.9 years
male:
71.8 years
female:
76.1 years (2020 est.)

Total fertility rate:
2.29 children born/woman (2020 est.)

Nationality:
noun:
Micronesian(s)
adjective:
Micronesian; Kosraean(s), Pohnpeian(s), Chuukese, Yapese

Ethnic groups:
Chuukese 49.3%, Pohnpeian 29.8%, Kosraean 6.3%, Yapese 5.7%, other 8.9%

Religions:
Roman Catholic 54.7%, Protestant 41.1%, other and none 4.2% (see Religion in the Federated States of Micronesia)

Languages:
English (official and common language), Chuukese, Pohnpeian, Yapese, Kosraean (recognized at state level in  Chuuk, Pohnpei, Yap and Kosrae respectively) In addition other language such as Pingelapese, Ngatikese, Satawalese, Puluwatese, Mortlockese, Mokilese, Ulithian, Woleaian, Nukuoro, and Kapingamarangi are recognized.

Literacy:
definition:
age 15 and over can read and write
total population:
89%
male:
91%
female:
88% (1980 est.)

References

 
Society of the Federated States of Micronesia